Shillong Airport  is a domestic airport serving Shillong, the capital of Meghalaya, India.

History 
The airport was constructed in the mid-1960s and became operational in the mid-1970s. Land measuring 224.16 acres was acquired for expansion of the airport in 2009. The work commenced in June 2009 and was completed in May 2010. The new terminal building, built at a cost of Rs. 30 crore, was inaugurated in June 2011.

In 2015, the Airports Authority of India (AAI) was allotted land for the further expansion of the airport. 
In 2017, AAI upgraded infrastructure at Shillong, with the installation of an Instrument landing system (ILS), construction of two refuelling facilities, extension of runway and removal of flight-path obstructions. The airport received its Category 3C license from the Indian DGCA in June 2019, allowing operations of Q400/ ATR 72 aircraft.
IndiGo  began operations using an ATR-72 from Shillong on 20 July 2019 under the UDAN scheme with a daily flight from Kolkata airport.

The present 6,000 ft runway was planned to be extended to about 8,000 feet to facilitate operation of narrow body jet aircraft like Boeing 737 and Airbus A320.
However, this would require the cutting of clusters of hillocks that would come in the way of approaching aircraft after the runway was extended. The cost of this obstacle removal was  8,000 Crores.
The Meghalaya Chief minister stated that it would be difficult to go ahead with expansion of the airport at that cost.

Airlines and destinations

Statistics

References

External links
Official site at the Airports Authority of India

Transport in Shillong
Airports in Meghalaya
Indian Air Force bases
1970s establishments in Meghalaya
Airports established in the 1970s
Airports with year of establishment missing
20th-century architecture in India